Mikhail Davydov may refer to:

 Mikhail Davydov (footballer) (born 1972), Russian football player
 Mikhail Davydov (oncologist) (born 1947), Russian oncologist